Inessa Mykolajivna Kravets (née Shulyak, ; born 5 October 1966) is a Ukrainian former triple jumper and long jumper. She was among the most prominent female triple jumpers during the period that the event was added to competition programmes at major competitions, and she was the world record holder, until the 2021 Olympics when Yulimar Rojas broke her record. Her record was one of the most durable in women's athletics.

Career
Born in Dnipropetrovsk, her breakthrough in the triple jump came in 1991 when she broke the world record with a clearance of 14.95 metres in June. Her first major medals came in 1992. At the inaugural appearance of the women's triple jump at the 1992 European Athletics Indoor Championships she won the gold medal. Later that year at the 1992 Summer Olympics she claimed the long jump silver as part of the Unified Team.

She followed this with a gold medal at the first women's triple jump at the 1993 IAAF World Indoor Championships, but due to a doping ban she did not compete at the debut of the event at the 1993 World Championships in Athletics, where Russia's Anna Biryukova took the title. In 1994 she won the long jump at the 1994 IAAF World Cup and doubled up at the 1994 European Athletics Championships to take long jump silver and triple jump bronze.

She jumped the world record at the 1995 World Championships in Gothenburg with 15.50 metres after studying a picture of Jonathan Edwards. The following year she won the Olympic gold medal at the 1996 Atlanta Olympics, becoming the first ever women's champion in the triple jump.

Ban and suspension 
In 1993, Kravets was banned three months for use of stimulants. Kravets was suspended for two years in July 2000 after testing positive for a performance-enhancing steroid.

See also
List of sportspeople sanctioned for doping offences

References

External links

1966 births
Living people
Sportspeople from Dnipro
Soviet female long jumpers
Soviet female triple jumpers
Ukrainian female triple jumpers
Ukrainian female long jumpers
Olympic athletes of the Unified Team
Olympic athletes of Ukraine
Athletes (track and field) at the 1988 Summer Olympics
Athletes (track and field) at the 1992 Summer Olympics
Athletes (track and field) at the 1996 Summer Olympics
Olympic gold medalists for Ukraine
Olympic silver medalists for the Unified Team
World Athletics Championships medalists
European Athletics Championships medalists
Doping cases in athletics
Ukrainian sportspeople in doping cases
Medalists at the 1996 Summer Olympics
Medalists at the 1992 Summer Olympics
Olympic gold medalists in athletics (track and field)
Olympic silver medalists in athletics (track and field)
Universiade medalists in athletics (track and field)
Goodwill Games medalists in athletics
Universiade gold medalists for the Soviet Union
CIS Athletics Championships winners
Soviet Athletics Championships winners
World Athletics Indoor Championships winners
World Athletics Championships winners
Medalists at the 1991 Summer Universiade
Competitors at the 1990 Goodwill Games